Carlo Ascanio Lanzillotti  (February 18, 1911 – May 12, 1979) was a Republican member of the New York State Senate.

He was elected to the New York State Senate in 1952, the last Republican from western Queens to do so. He was a member of the State Senate (7th D.) in 1953 and 1954. He was defeated for re-election in 1954, 1956 and 1962.

Lanzillotti is buried at St. Charles Cemetery, near Farmingdale, Long Island.

Legacy
He was a brother-in-law of Donato Antone, creator of the Harvey Wallbanger cocktail; grandfather of Christopher Lanzillotti, a New York Sun columnist and New York County Republican District Leader; and great-uncle of Paul Lanzillotti, an MBA admissions consultant, author and creator of the Business School Selector.

External links

1911 births
1979 deaths
People from Queens, New York
Republican Party New York (state) state senators
20th-century American politicians